Sandford is a village and civil parish in the Mid Devon district, within Devon, England. Sandford is part of the electoral ward named Sandford and Creedy. The ward population at the 2011 Census was 3,429.

History
The Grade II listed school main building dates from 1825, and is notable for its classical Greek architecture and cob walls, thought to be the highest of their kind in the country.

Present
The village has its own community-owned shop and post office, two pubs, The Lamb Inn  and The Rose and Crown, a Primary school, a church, St Swithuns with a font of Caen stone, and minor football and cricket teams.

It is linked by cycle/foot path to nearby Crediton through the Millennium Green - a wild flower meadow with herb garden, example of cob walling, and a large pond. An annual pumpkin growing competition is held there in late September.

The actors Luke and Harry Treadaway were raised in the village.

Near the village is Fordy Wood Copse a   woodland owned and managed by the Woodland Trust.

Historic estates
The area surrounding the town of Crediton is particularly well populated with important historic estates. Those within the parish of Sandford include:

Dowrich

Dowrich (anciently Dowrish) is an historic estate in the parish of Sandford.  Between the 12th century and 1717 it was the seat of the ancient gentry family of Dowrish (originally de Dowrish) which took its name from the estate where it had become established before the reign of King John (1199-1216), when it built a castle keep on the site. A 15th century gatehouse survives there today, next to the ancient mansion house. The arms of the Dowrish family were: Argent a bend cotised sable a bordure engrailed of the last. An elaborate monumental brass survives in Sandford Church to the wife of Walter Dowrish, namely Mary Carew (1550-1604), daughter of Dr. George Carew, Dean of Windsor, 3rd son of Sir Edmund Carew, Baron Carew, of Mohuns Ottery in the parish of Luppitt, Devon, and sister of George Carew, 1st Earl of Totnes (1555-1629).

Creedy

Creedy Park was long the seat of the Davie Baronets and their heirs the Ferguson-Davie Baronets, influential in the life of the parish of Sandford, to many members of which family survive monuments in the parish church. Sandford School was built in 1825, in the form of a classical Greek temple, by Sir Humphrey Phineas Davie, 10th Baronet (1775–1846).

Ruxford

Effigies of Sir John de Sully (1282-1388), KG, and his wife Isobel exist in Crediton Parish Church. Sully was lord of the manor of Iddesleigh, but was said by Westcote (d.circa 1637) to have had his seat at "Rookesford, lately the land of Chichester and alienated to Davye", i.e. Ruxford, in the parish of Sandford about 1/2 mile north-west of Crediton. He held Rokysforde from the overlord John de Raleigh of Raleigh in the parish of Pilton, as is evidenced in the latter's deed of 1362 now held in the North Devon Record Office. The heir of John de Raleigh by marriage to his daughter Thomasine was the Chichester family of Raleigh. According to Hoskins the estate of Ruxford is recorded in a charter dated 930 in which a large estate was granted to the canons of Crediton Church. The existing farmhouse known as Ruxford Barton was rebuilt in 1608 by the Chichester family, as is evidenced by a strapwork cartouche in plaster-work displaying the arms of that family with initials and date 1608, in the principal bedroom on the first floor of the parlour wing.
In 1618 Ruxford Barton was purchased from Sir Robert Chichester, Bart, KB, by  Emmanuel Davie, a "clothier of Crediton", a cousin of the Davie family of Creedy, Sandford. The deed of conveyance is summarised as follows:
The Right Worshipful Sir Robert Chichester of the noble Order of the Bath, Bart, to Emmanuel Davie of Sandford in Crediton, gentleman, whereas ... the Barton Farm, messuage etc called Rokisfoorde or Ruxford, a close of land called Mylum and a parcel of lande a meadow called Nether Apple Meadow in Crediton ... a meadow called Heddge Mead... now sells the premises with all the messuages, buildings, goods, lands etc, etc, to Emmanuel...".

In about 1620 a plaster escutcheon was affixed inside the house showing the de Via arms of the Davie family impaled with the arms of Northcote, the arms of the family of his first wife Katherine Northcote (d.1620).

West Sandford

Francis Hall (d.1728) of West Sandford, Crediton, married Frances Quicke, daughter of Andrew Quicke (1666-1736) of Newton St. Cyres, Devon. A monument to Francis Hall (d.1728) exists in Newton St Cyres Church. She married secondly Sir John Chichester, 4th Baronet (1689-1740), of Youlston Park, to whose family the estate of West Sandford appears to have descended. West Sandford was a very large mansion about 2 1/2 miles NW of Crediton, near the ancient Chichester estate of Ruxford, of which a watercolour painting was made in 1797 by the Devon topographer Rev. John Swete. The latter wrote of West Sandford in his Travel Journal in 1797 as follows: "The appearance of this house, built with brick and decorated with white mouldings, is of great respectability. Its contiguous gardens with high walls and large gates and the groves that shelter it on the NE speak it to have been the residence of some person of consequence who had a relish for things of former days and was too advanced in years to adopt the improvements of modern taste. It was long the property and abode of Lady Chichester and by her decease a few years ago became a possession of Sir John Chichester of Youlston, Bart. Beheld in its two fronts from a rising point of the public road it had such extent of building as to possess a degree of magnificence; nor has it less to recommend itself for its situation, having spread out before its windows some of the richest pasture ground in the county. What ingredients of the picturesque, taking advantage of the road as a foreground, may enter into the composition of the scenery, may be collected from the following sketch". This large house had already been demolished by 1822 as reported by Lysons, who stated the estate was then owned by  John Quicke, Esq. The memory of this house has faded, no mention of its former existence having been made by Pevsner or Hoskins, the leading modern authorities on such matters.

References

External links

 Sandford Community Website
 Sandford School

Villages in Mid Devon District
Civil parishes in Devon